Andrew Tynes (born 13 February 1972) is a retired Bahamian sprinter who specialized in the 200 metres.

Biography
He won gold medals at the 1993 Central American and Caribbean Games and the 1993 Central American and Caribbean Championships, and a silver medal at the 1995 Pan American Games.

His personal best time was 20.22 seconds, achieved in April 1993 in El Paso. Tynes also co-holds the Bahamian record in the 4 x 100 metres relay, achieved with teammates Renward Wells, Dominic Demeritte and Iram Lewis.

Achievements

References

Notes

External links

Picture of Andrew Tynes

1972 births
Living people
Bahamian male sprinters
Pan American Games silver medalists for the Bahamas
Athletes (track and field) at the 1995 Pan American Games
Athletes (track and field) at the 1996 Summer Olympics
Athletes (track and field) at the 2000 Summer Olympics
Olympic athletes of the Bahamas
UTEP Miners men's track and field athletes
Pan American Games medalists in athletics (track and field)
Central American and Caribbean Games gold medalists for the Bahamas
Competitors at the 1993 Central American and Caribbean Games
Competitors at the 2002 Central American and Caribbean Games
Central American and Caribbean Games medalists in athletics
Medalists at the 1995 Pan American Games